Albert Sharpe (15 April 1885 – 13 February 1970) was a Irish stage and film actor.

Life and work
Albert Edward Sharpe was born at 8 Goudy's Court in Belfast on 15 April 1885, one of six children born to fishmonger John Sharpe, a Presbyterian, and Mary Collins, a Roman Catholic. He attended St. Mary's Christian Brothers Grammar School.

In December 1918 he married Margaret "Madge" Waterson and they had six children, three sons and three daughters.

His most famous roles were those of Darby O'Gill in Disney's Darby O'Gill and the Little People featuring Sean Connery, and as Finian McLonergan in the Original Broadway production of the musical Finian's Rainbow. (The film version, made in 1968, stars Fred Astaire in the role.) On screen he played Fiona's father Andrew in the MGM musical Brigadoon. He was in The Day They Robbed the Bank of England (1960) with Peter O'Toole.

He was also a member of the Abbey Players.

His last ten years were spent in retirement at Iveagh Crescent off the Falls Road. He died in 1970 in Belfast at the age of 84.

Filmography

References

External links

1885 births
1970 deaths
Donaldson Award winners
People educated at St. Mary's Christian Brothers' Grammar School, Belfast
Irish male film actors
Irish male stage actors
20th-century Irish male actors